Autoplusia is a genus of moths of the family Noctuidae.

Species
 Autoplusia abrota Druce, 1889
 Autoplusia egena Guenée, 1852
 Autoplusia egenoides Franclemont & Todd, 1983
 Autoplusia gammoides Blanchard, 1852
 Autoplusia masoni Schaus, 1894
 Autoplusia olivacea Skinner, 1917
 Autoplusia phocina Hampson, 1913

References
 Autoplusia at Markku Savela's Lepidoptera and Some Other Life Forms
 Natural History Museum Lepidoptera genus database

Plusiinae